Island Lake is a lake in Aitkin County, Minnesota, in the United States.

Island Lake was named for the large lake island which is named Massmann Island it contains.

See also
List of lakes in Minnesota

References

Lakes of Minnesota
Lakes of Aitkin County, Minnesota